Puttinillu Mettinillu is a 1973 Indian Telugu-language film directed by Pattu and produced by AVM Productions. It is a remake of the Tamil film Puguntha Veedu (1972). The film was released on 12 July 1973.

Plot

Cast 
 Savitri (actress) as Ravi's Mother
 Krishna as Gopinath "Gopi"
 Sobhan Babu as Ravi
 Lakshmi as Latha
 Chandrakala as Vasanthi
 V. Nagayya
 Raja Babu as Hanumanthu and Lingamurthy (dual role)
 Ramana Reddy as Telugu Lecturer
 Rama Prabha as Ammanni/Bhanu

Production 
Puttinillu Mettinillu was directed by Pattu, and produced by M. Murugan, M. Kumaran, M. Saravanan and M. Balasubramanian under AVM Productions. The story was written by A. S. Prakasam, and the dialogue by N. R. Nandi. Cinematography was handled by S. Maruti Rao, and the editing by R. Vittal. The art director was A. K. Sekhar, and the dance choreographers were Madurai Ramu and T. Jayaram.

Soundtrack 
The soundtrack of the film was composed by Chellapilla Satyam.

References

External links 
 

1970s Telugu-language films
AVM Productions films
Films scored by Satyam (composer)
Telugu remakes of Tamil films